The Vancouver School Board (VSB; officially School District 39 Vancouver) is a school district based in Vancouver, British Columbia, Canada. A board of nine trustees normally manages this district that serves the city of Vancouver and the University Endowment Lands.

Board of Education

The Vancouver Board of Education is composed of nine elected trustees and a student trustee. Trustees of the Vancouver School Board are elected under an at-large system.

Since 2022

As of November 2022, the trustees of the Vancouver School Board, listed by number of votes received during the 2022 Vancouver municipal election, are:

2018–2022

, the trustees of the Vancouver School Board, listed by number of votes received during the 2018 Vancouver municipal election, are:

2017–2018

All positions on the school board were vacated on October 17, 2016, when the elected board was removed by provincial Education Minister Mike Bernier for failing to pass a balanced budget. A by-election was held on October 14, 2017, for all trustee seats. The trustees elected during that by-election, listed by number of votes received, were:

2014–2016
The trustees elected during the 2014 Vancouver municipal election served until they were removed by Education Minister Mike Bernier on October 17, 2016, for failing to pass a balanced budget. Listed by number of votes received, they were:

Demographics

The Vancouver school district is a large, urban and multicultural school district. , the district provides programs to 54,000 students in kindergarten to grade 12, as well as over 2,000 adults in adult education programs.

In 2014, there were 1,473 international students in Vancouver public schools.

Seismic upgrading
The Ministry of Education launched a seismic upgrading program in March 2005 to upgrade schools all over British Columbia.  The program is quoted to cost a total of $1.5 billion.  The following schools in the Vancouver School Board are supported to proceed with seismic mitigation in 2015:  Killarney Secondary, David Thompson Secondary, Maple Grove Elementary, Lord Tennyson Elementary, Dr. Annie B. Jamieson Elementary, Eric Hamber Secondary, Point Grey Secondary, Renfrew Community Elementary, Sir Alexander Mackenzie Elementary, Waverley Elementary, Edith Cavell Elementary, Prince of Wales Secondary, Templeton Secondary, General Wolf Elementary, David Lloyd George Elementary, and Bayview Community Elementary.

Elementary schools

 Admiral Seymour
 Bayview
 Britannia Elementary
 Captain James Cook Elementary
 Carnarvon
 Champlain Heights
 Charles Dickens
 Chief Maquinna
 David Livingstone
 David Lloyd George
 David Oppenheimer
 Dr. A.R. Lord
 Dr. Annie B. Jamieson
 Dr. George M. Weir
 Dr. H.N. MacCorkindale
 Dr. R.E. McKechnie
 Edith Cavell
 Elsie Roy
 Emily Carr
 False Creek
 Florence Nightingale
 General Brock
 General Gordon Elementary School
 General Wolfe
 George T. Cunningham
 Graham D Bruce
 Grandview ʔuuqinak’uuh
Grenfell
 Hastings
 Henry Hudson
 J.W. Sexsmith
 John Henderson
 John Norquay
 Jules Quesnel
 Kerrisdale Elementary School
 L'Ecole Bilingue
 Laura Secord
 Lord Beaconsfield
 Lord Kitchener
 Lord Nelson
 Lord Roberts
 Lord Selkirk
 Lord Strathcona
 Lord Tennyson
 Maple Grove
 Mount Pleasant
 Nootka
 Norma Rose Point School
 Pierre Elliott Trudeau Elementary School
 Queen Alexandra
 Queen Elizabeth
 Queen Mary
 Queen Victoria Annex
 Quilchena
 Renfrew
 Shaughnessy
 Simon Fraser
 Sir Alexander Mackenzie
 Sir Charles Kingsford-Smith
 Sir Guy Carleton
 Sir James Douglas
 Sir John Franklin Elementary School
 wek̓ʷan̓əs tə syaqʷəm (formerly named Sir Matthew Begbie)
 Sir Richard McBride
 Sir Sandford Fleming Elementary School
 Sir Wilfred Grenfell
 Sir Wilfrid Laurier
 Sir William Osler
 Sir William Van Horne
 Southlands
 šxʷwəq̓ʷəθət Crosstown Elementary
 Tecumseh
 Thunderbird šxʷəxʷaʔəs
 Trafalgar
 Tyee
 University Hill Elementary
 Vancouver Learning Network Elementary
 Walter Moberly
 Waverley
 χpey̓ Elementary (formerly named Sir William MacDonald from 1906–2017)

David Lloyd George Elementary School
David Lloyd George Elementary School is an elementary school in the Marpole neighbourhood. It holds approximately 427 students in grades K through 7. The school opened in 1921 and was named after David Lloyd George, the British prime minister from 1916 to 1922. The sports teams are called the DLG Hornets and wear blue.

David Oppenheimer Elementary School
David Oppenheimer Elementary School opened in 1959 and was named after one of the early mayors of the city, David Oppenheimer. It is located at 2421 Scarboro Avenue, in the Victoria-Fraserview neighbourhood. As of 2016, the school principal is Rosie Finch; the school's sports teams are called the Orcas.

General Gordon Elementary School
General Gordon Elementary School is an elementary school that opened in 1912. It was named for British general Charles George Gordon, who was killed at Khartoum in January 1885. It is located at 2268 Bayswater Street. In September 2008, it was selected as one of three schools in a pilot provincially supported "Neighbourhoods of Learning" program.

Lord Tennyson Elementary School
Lord Tennyson Elementary School is a French immersion school opened in 1912, named after 19th-century British poet Alfred Tennyson, The 1st Baron Tennyson. It is located at 1936 West 10th Avenue. As of 2022, the school principal is Bruce Salle. Lord Tennyson is a feeder school for Kitsilano Secondary School, where graduates can continue their education in French Immersion.

Nootka Elementary School
Nootka Elementary School opened in 1959 as Lord Beaconsfield Annex, but a growing student population led to school status being granted in 1963. It is located at 3375 Nootka Street. As of 2016, the current school principal is Monika Sanft and the vice-principal is Megan Davies.

Queen Alexandra Elementary School
Queen Alexandra Elementary School opened in 1909 and was named for Queen Alexandra, wife of King Edward VII. It is located at 1300 East Broadway, at the intersection with Clark Drive. It is near Vancouver Community College's Broadway campus, and is easily accessible from VCC–Clark station and Commercial–Broadway station on the SkyTrain. , the  school principal is John MacCormack.

Queen Mary Elementary School
Queen Mary Elementary School opened in 1915. It is located at 2000 Trimble Street at 4th Avenue in the West Point Grey neighbourhood. As of 2020, the school principal is Megan Davies. The school has a population of about 450 students from grade K-7. Queen Mary Elementary School is on a hill close to Locarno Beach. It has two buildings, a gravel field and two playgrounds. The main red building was a former town hall for the city of Vancouver. It is named for Queen Mary, the wife of George V.

Shaughnessy Elementary School
Shaughnessy Elementary School opened in 1920 as Prince of Wales Elementary and Secondary School. In 1960, the current Prince of Wales Secondary School was opened nearby, and the school was renamed after the surrounding Shaughnessy neighbourhood. The school is located at 4250 Marguerite Street, near King Edward Avenue and Granville Street.

χpey̓ Elementary School 
χpey̓ Elementary opened in 1906 as Sir William Macdonald Elementary School in honour of the Canadian tobacco manufacturer and major education philanthropist. Macdonald was unofficially rechristened "χpey̓" on October 24, 2017, following a 2-year VSB initiative to rename the school to better reflect "the Indigenous heritage and education history of the area" as well as "the District Aboriginal Focus School program". The name, which means "cedar" in the henqeminem dialect of the Musqueam nation, was nominated by Chief Wayne Sparrow and Musqueam council members. The change became official following a Musqueam renaming ceremony on June 1, 2018. Because of its low enrollment and high seismic risk, χpey̓ was shortlisted for closure in 2015, but Vancouver City Council elected to keep it open until at least 2020. χpey̓ is located at 1959 East Hastings Street in East Vancouver's Grandview-Woodland area, but since becoming a First Nations focus school in 2012, its catchment area has switched from local to district.

List of elementary annexes

 Champlain Heights Annex
 Charles Dickens Annex
 Collingwood Neighbourhood (Bruce Annex)
 Garibaldi Annex (Nelson Annex)
 Henderson Annex (not enrolling since September 2016.)
 Kerrisdale Annex
 Maquinna Annex (not enrolling since September 2015.)
 McBride Annex
 Queen Elizabeth Annex (Jules Quesnel Annex)
 Queen Victoria (Secord Annex)
 Roberts Annex
 Selkirk Annex
 Sir James Douglas Annex
 Sir Wilfrid Laurier Annex (not enrolling since September 2016.)
 Tecumseh Annex
 Tillicum Annex (Hastings Annex)

Secondary schools
The VSB operates 18 secondary schools within Vancouver and the University Endowment Lands. Secondary schools in the district begin at Grade 8 and continue to Grade 12, where students graduate with their Dogwood Diploma.

Alternative program education sites

 8J/9J Program
 Aries Program
 Byng Satellite Program (closed 2010)
 Cedar Walk Program
 East Side Program
 Epic Program
 Foundations program
 Genesis Broadway
 Genesis North East
 Genesis South
 Hamber House Adolescent Day Treatment program
 Outreach Program
 Pinnacle Program
 Streetfront Program
 Sunrise East Program
 Take A Hike Program
 The West Program
 Total Education Program
 Tupper Young Parents Alternative Program
 Vinery Program
 Waverley Annex Learning Hub – Spectrum
 West Coast Alternative Program

Special programs
The University Transition Program is an early university entrance program that is located in University of British Columbia. Students of this program have access to most UBC facilities, and also possess UBC ID cards.
TREK Outdoor Education Program
International Baccalaureate programs at Britannia Secondary School and Sir Winston Churchill Secondary School
City School
Aboriginal Education

Mini-schools
Mini-schools are enriched programs for highly motivated students. Mini-schools begin at grade 8, with approximately 500 total spots available. Each year over 1400 students apply for mini-schools, with admission based on district assessment results, grade 6 and 7 report cards, applications, and interviews.

Mini-schools in the district include:
Britannia Hockey Academy
Britannia Venture Program
Byng Arts Mini School
David Thompson Odyssey Program
Gladstone Mini School
Hamber Challenge Studio Program
Ideal Mini School
John Oliver Digital Immersion Mini School
Killarney Mini School
King George Mini School
Magee SPARTS
Point Grey Mini School
Prince of Wales Mini School
Synergy at Churchill
Templeton Mini School
Tupper Mini School
Vancouver Technical Flex Humanities Program
Vancouver Technical Summit Program
Windermere Leadership

Transgender policy
In June 2014, the Vancouver School Board adopted a new policy regarding transgender children. It intends to support transgender and LGBTQ in allowing them be called by the name they identify with. They will also be able to use whichever washroom they feel most comfortable in.

Notes

References

External links
 
 

School districts in British Columbia
Education in Vancouver